The Sunny Cowgirls is an Australian country music group formed in 2005. They have released a total of seven studio albums since 2005. Their debut album, Little Bit Rusty, was released in 2005. Their latest album, Here We Go, was released in September 2016.

Biography
The Sunny Cowgirls, Sophie and Celeste Clabburn, grew up on a farm in Hamilton, Victoria. The Clabburn sisters were raised on "Sunninghill", the family farm at Dunkeld near Hamilton, Victoria, before the whole family moved to Perth, Western Australia when they were primary school kids. Their farm was in their father's family a long while, and that's where they came up with the name "Sunny". After four years of working around the country and doing the occasional gig, they raised enough cash to approach well-known Perth record producer Mark Donohoe to showcase their writing and music.

The Cowgirls lives and careers changed in early 2005 when they secured places as aspiring artists in the CMAA College of Country Music, held before the Tamworth Country Music Festival each year. They then signed with Compass Bros Records and their first album, Little Bit Rusty, reached No. 4 on the ARIA country charts.
 
The Sunny Cowgirls have also collaborated with Adam Brand on "Someday".

On 1 September 2012 The Sunny Cowgirls performed at the 25th Trundle Bush Tucker Day.

Discography

Studio albums

Live albums

Singles

Music videos

Awards and nominations

AIR Awards
The Australian Independent Record Awards (commonly known informally as AIR Awards) is an annual awards night to recognise, promote and celebrate the success of Australia's Independent Music sector.

|-
| AIR Awards of 2010
|Summer 
| Best Independent Country Album
| 
|-
| AIR Awards of 2013
|What We Do 
| Best Independent Country Album
| 
|-

Country Music Awards of Australia

The Country Music Awards of Australia (CMAA) (also known as the Golden Guitar Awards) is an annual awards night held in January during the Tamworth Country Music Festival, celebrating recording excellence in the Australian country music industry. They have been held annually since 1973.

|-
| 2011
| The Sunny Cowgirls
| Horizon Award
| 

 Note: wins only

References

Australian country music groups
Country music duos
Sibling musical duos
Musical groups established in 2005